Terence Arthur Hibbitt (1 December 1947 – 5 August 1994) was an English footballer who played for Leeds United, Newcastle United and Birmingham City. His brother Kenny was also a footballer. He died of cancer in 1994, aged just 46.

During his time at Leeds he played in the second leg of the 1968 Inter-Cities Fairs Cup Final as they defeated Ferencváros on aggregate, and also made 12 appearances (and scored 3 goals) as they won the First Division in 1968–69.

Gateshead

He went on to play non-league football with Gateshead until 1986, during which time he also coached the team. He made 130 appearances in all competitions for Gateshead, scoring seven goals.

References

External links
 

1947 births
1994 deaths
Association football midfielders
English footballers
Leeds United F.C. players
Newcastle United F.C. players
Birmingham City F.C. players
Gateshead F.C. players
English Football League players
England semi-pro international footballers
Gateshead F.C. managers
Deaths from cancer in England
Footballers from Bradford
English football managers
FA Cup Final players